The men's allround combination in the 2015–16 ISU Speed Skating World Cup will be contested over the 1500 and 5000 metre distances on a single World Cup occasion, in Stavanger, Norway, on 29–31 January 2016.

The allround combination is a new event for the season.

Top three

Race medallists

References 

 
Men allround combination